Bolshaya Stepanovskaya is a rural locality (a village) in Ramenskoye Rural Settlement, Sheksninsky District, Vologda Oblast, Russia. The population was 16 as of 2002.

Geography 
Bolshaya Stepanovskaya is located 79 km north of Sheksna (the district's administrative centre) by road. Levinskaya is the nearest rural locality.

References 

Rural localities in Sheksninsky District